Christiane Lutz (born 1980 in Mainz) is a German opera director.

Biography 
Lutz lives in Vienna, where she began studying theatre studies, art history, musicology und business administration, and then continued to study stage direction at the University of Music and Performing Arts Vienna.

She gathered her first experiences in stage directing with Peter Konwitschny and Achim Freyer. Christiane Lutz was employed as an opera director at the Theater Lübeck and after that at the Opernhaus Graz, where she directed Alcina by Georg Friedrich Händel amongst other pieces. From 2009 to 2011, Lutz was assistant director to Michael Sturminger on the international tour of The Infernal Comedy – Confessions of a Serial Killer and The Giacomo Variations starring John Malkovich in the title role. She started working closely with opera director Claus Guth in 2011. From 2012 to 2014 Christiane Lutz coordinated the children's opera tent of the Wiener Staatsoper, where she directed the premiere of the piece Das Städtchen Drumherum, written by the Austrian composer Elisabeth Naske.

Her current productions include Reigen at the Opéra National de Paris, Wozzeck at the Staatstheater Cottbus, La traviata at the Operklosterneuburg and Manon at the Salzburger Landestheater.

Lutz is married to the tenor Jonas Kaufmann. They have one child together.

Productions

Awards and stipends 
Lutz received scholarships from the Bayreuther Festspiele and the Salzburger Festspiele. She was a finalist at the Ring award in 2014.

External links 
 official website of Christiane Lutz
 Bayerische Staatsoper – biographies – Christiane Lutz. Retrieved 10 October 2019
 Salzburger Landestheater – Personen – Christiane Lutz. Retrieved 10 October 2019 
 Wiener Zeitung on Christiane Lutz’ Rinaldo. Retrieved 29 May 2019
 BR-Klassik on Lutz’ Manon. Retrieved 29 May 2019
 Music always speaks louder than words – Interview with Christiane Lutz. Retrieved 29 May 2019
 Review in Forum Opera of Lutz’ Reigen. Retrieved 29 May 2019

References 

1980 births
Living people
German opera directors
Female opera directors
People from Mainz
University of Music and Performing Arts Vienna alumni